The 1976–77 DDR-Oberliga was the 28th season of the DDR-Oberliga, the first tier of league football in East Germany.

The league was contested by fourteen teams. Dynamo Dresden won the championship, the club's fifth of eight East German championships. Dynamo Dresden went on to win the FDGB-Pokal as well, defeating 1. FC Lokomotive Leipzig in the final and thereby repeating its double.

Joachim Streich of 1. FC Magdeburg was the league's top scorer with 17 goals, the first of four occasions to finish as league top scorer, a record jointly held with Hans-Jürgen Kreische, while Hans-Jürgen Dörner of Dynamo Dresden won the seasons East German Footballer of the year award.

On the strength of the 1976–77 title Dresden qualified for the 1977–78 European Cup where the club was knocked out by eventual winners Liverpool in the second round. Fourth-placed club 1. FC Lokomotive Leipzig qualified for the 1977–78 European Cup Winners' Cup as the seasons FDGB-Pokal runners-up and was knocked out by Real Betis in the second round. Second-placed 1. FC Magdeburg qualified for the 1977–78 UEFA Cup where it was knocked out in the quarter finals by PSV Eindhoven while third-placed FC Carl Zeiss Jena lost to SEC Bastia, also in the quarter finals.

Table									
The 1976–77 season saw two newly promoted clubs 1. FC Union Berlin and F.C. Hansa Rostock.

Results

References

Sources

External links
 Das Deutsche Fussball Archiv  Historic German league tables

East
1
1976-77